The Book of the Shadowlands: The Writings of Kuni Mokuna is a 1997 role-playing game supplement for Legend of the Five Rings Roleplaying Game published by Alderac Entertainment Group.

Contents
The Book of the Shadowlands is a supplement in which the region known as the Shadowlands are detailed.

Reception
The Book of the Shadowlands was reviewed in the online second version of Pyramid which said "The Book of the Shadowlands purports to be the journal of Kuni Mokuna, a Crab Clan shugenja (wizard-priest), who traveled extensively in the Shadowlands, documenting its many repulsive features. It's been helpfully "translated" by Cris Dornaus and Rob Vaux, who've managed a fine job of getting across the personality of this self-justifying lunatic, a man who spends his time dissecting trolls and visiting goblins, much to his Clan's disgust. The layout is cleverly done, with Mokuna's text "handwritten" on parchment, and game statistics and rules in sidebars when needed. There are also excellent illustrations on almost every page, which give a suitably brooding air to the book even before you start reading it."

Reviews
Backstab #9
Backstab #15

References

Legend of the Five Rings Roleplaying Game
Role-playing game books
Role-playing game supplements introduced in 1997